Lauaki may refer to:

Tongan Star
Epalahame Lauaki 
Sione Lauaki

Tongan Title
Lauaki (Royal Undertaker)

Other
Lauaki Namulauulu Mamoe